"No Strings (I'm Fancy Free)" is a popular song written by Irving Berlin for the 1935 film Top Hat, where it was introduced by Fred Astaire. In the film, the character played by Astaire is advised to get married and Astaire responds by saying he prefers to remain as a bachelor and he launches into this song and a major dance routine.(Top Hat#Musical numbers and choreography)

Lyrics
In me, you see a youth
Who is completely on the loose
No yens, no yearnings

No strings and no connections
No ties to my affections
I'm fancy free and free for anything fancy

No dates that can't be broken
No words that can't be spoken
Especially when I am feeling romancy

Like a robin upon a tree
Like a sailor that goes to sea
Like an unwritten melody
I'm free, that's me

So bring on the big attraction
My decks are cleared for action
I'm fancy free and free for anything fancy

Notable recordings
Fred Astaire's 1935 recording for Brunswick (catalog No. 7486) was very popular that year and Astaire recorded it again in 1952 for his album The Astaire Story. 
Ramona, Ramona and Her Grand Piano, recorded 9/13/1935.Ella Fitzgerald - Ella Fitzgerald Sings the Irving Berlin Songbook'' (1958)

References

Songs written by Irving Berlin
Songs written for films
Fred Astaire songs
1935 songs